Thrasher is an unincorporated community in Prentiss County, Mississippi, United States.

It was named for John H. Thrashe, a settler appointed as the first postmaster. The hamlet was a flag stop on the Mobile and Ohio Railroad, built in the 1850s.

Notes

Unincorporated communities in Prentiss County, Mississippi
Unincorporated communities in Mississippi